Resoviaornis is an extinct genus of passerine bird from the Early Oligocene (28.5-29 Ma) of southern Poland. Only one species is recorded for the genus, Resoviaornis jamrozi.

References

Passeriformes
Oligocene birds
Fossil taxa described in 2013
Fossils of Poland
Prehistoric bird genera
Extinct monotypic bird genera